Mod Mobilian was a regional website focused on the music, art and culture of metro Mobile, the Eastern Shore, and the surrounding areas of the Southeastern United States. It was started in 2009 by co-editors Trey Lane and Doc Valso.   It had over 20 contributing writers including videographer Kris Skoda, disc jockey Emily Hayes, columnist Kevin Lee, playwright Danielle Juzan, and political columnist Jessica James.  It was the largest independent arts and culture website on the Central Gulf Coast in terms of social network followers and monthly views. In 2012, it was the official interview crew for Deluna Fest in Pensacola, Florida. In 2012, it was selected as "Best Local Website" by the newspaper Lagniappe.  It is a contributing site to the multi-state Southern music aggregator website, SouthSounds Review.

Mod Mobilian Press
The Mod Mobilian Press started in 2011 and has released four books by local authors.
Kevin B. Lee - Colonnades
Janet Nodar - Trumpet Field and Other Stories
Tributaries 2012 Mobile Bay literary anthology
Kenneth A. Robinson - Port City Crusader: John LeFlore and the Non-Partisan Voters’ League in Mobile, Alabama.

Mod Mobilian Records
In 2013, Mod Mobilian Records co-released El Cantador's EP Translation Wave with This Is American Music.

Mod Mobilian Records and This Is American Music co-released New Orleans group Hurray for the Riff Raff's album My Dearest Darkest Neighbor on July 1, 2013.

Notes and references

External links
 Mod Mobilian

Culture of Mobile, Alabama